MNH or mnh may refer to:

 Museo Nacional de Historia, a national museum of Mexico
 MNH, the IATA code for Rustaq Airport, Oman
 MNH, the Indian Railways station code for Munsirhat railway station, West Bengal, India
 mnh, the ISO 639-3 code for Mono language (Congo), Democratic Republic of the Congo